The 1952 New Mexico Lobos football team represented the University of New Mexico in the Skyline Conference during the 1952 college football season.  In their third and final season under head coach Dudley DeGroot, the Lobos compiled a 7–2 record (5–1 against Skyline opponents), and outscored all opponents by a total of 119 to 46.

On defense, the team shut out five opponents and allowed an average of 5.1 points per game, ranking as "the least-scored-on major college team in the nation."

Schedule

References

New Mexico
New Mexico Lobos football seasons
New Mexico Lobos football